The 3rd constituency of Moselle is a French legislative constituency in the Moselle département.

Description

Moselle's 3rd constituency includes the centre of Metz and a large swath of more rural areas to the east. The constituency lies in the centre of Moselle to the east of the river Moselle, which flows through Metz.

The constituency has been held by parties of the Gaullist right from 1988 until 2017 and in that time was only represented by two individuals Jean Louis Masson and Marie-Jo Zimmermann.

Historic Representation

Election results

2022 

 
 
|-
| colspan="8" bgcolor="#E9E9E9"|
|-
 

 
 
 
 

* Dissident Horizons member, not supported by party or Ensemble Citoyens alliance.

** Dissident PS member, not supported by party or NUPES alliance.

2017

2012

 
 
 
 
 
|-
| colspan="8" bgcolor="#E9E9E9"|
|-

Sources
Official results of French elections from 2002: "Résultats électoraux officiels en France" (in French).

3